The Beginning of the Enz is the fifth studio album from New Zealand rock group Split Enz. The album is a collection of non-album singles and demos that pre-date the band's first album, 1975's Mental Notes. Three of these songs, "129", "Lovey Dovey" and "Spellbound",  were later re-recorded and included on Mental Notes and Second Thoughts.

The album reached #35 in New Zealand, but did not chart in Australia.

An unrelated compilation album, Beginning of the Enz (dropping "The" from the title), was released in the UK in 1980 by Chrysalis Records.

Track listing
All songs by Phil Judd and Tim Finn, except track 7 by Phil Judd.
 "Split Ends" – Single B-side ("For You"), recorded and released 1973 – 1:49
 "For You" – Single, recorded and released 1973 – 3:50
 "129" –  Single B-side ("Sweet Talkin' Spoon Song"), recorded and released 1973 (re-recorded as 'Matinee Idyll (129)' on Second Thoughts in 1976) – 2:49
 "Home Sweet Home" – Single B-side ("No Bother To Me"), recorded 1973 and released 1975 – 3:43
 "Sweet Talkin' Spoon Song" – Single, recorded and released 1973 – 3:24
 "No Bother to Me" – Single, recorded 1974 and released 1975 – 3:11
 "Malmsbury Villa" – Previously unreleased demo, recorded 1974 – 2:49
 "Lovey Dovey" – Previously unreleased demo, recorded 1974 (re-recorded on Second Thoughts in 1976) – 3:23
 "Spellbound" – Previously unreleased demo with Tim Finn on lead vocal, recorded 1974 (re-recorded on Mental Notes in 1975 with Phil Judd on lead vocal) – 4:35

Personnel
Split Enz 

"Split Ends" and "For You"
Tim Finn - Vocals, Piano
Phil Judd - Vocals, Guitar, Mandolin
Mike Chunn - Bass
Miles Golding - Violin
Mike Howard - Flute
Div Vercoe - Drums
"129", "Home Sweet Home" and "Sweet Talkin' Spoon Song"
Tim Finn - Vocals, Piano
Phil Judd - Vocals, Guitar, Mandolin, Spoons
Mike Chunn - Bass
Paul "Wally" Wilkinson - Guitar 
Geoff Chunn - Drums 
"No Bother to Me", "Malmsbury Villa", "Lovey Dovey" and "Spellbound"
Tim Finn - Vocals, Piano
Phil Judd - Vocals, Guitar, Mandolin
Mike Chunn - Bass
Paul "Wally" Wilkinson - Guitar 
Geoffrey Chunn - Drums 
Eddie Rayner - Keyboards
Rob Gillies - Saxophone, Trumpet 

Additional musician

Rob Gillies played saxophone on "129", recorded before he joined the band as a full member

Charts

References

1979 albums
Split Enz albums